Auyán Tepui, also spelt Ayan, is a tepui in Bolívar state, Venezuela. It is incised from the north by a vast valley, the Cañón del Diablo (Devil's Canyon), formed by the Churún River. The larger western portion of the plateau is partially forested, whereas the eastern part comprises mostly bare rock with only patchy vegetation cover. The mountain hosts a number of extensive cave systems.

Auyán-tepui gives its name to the Auyán Massif, which also includes the tiny peaks of Cerro El Sol and Cerro La Luna to the north, and the satellite mountain of Uaipán-tepui to the south. It is situated entirely within the bounds of Canaima National Park. Auyán-tepui means "Devil's House" in the local Pemón language.

Angel Falls, the tallest  waterfall in the world, drops from a cleft near the summit.

Auyán-tepui achieved international fame in 1933 when Angel Falls was accidentally discovered by Jimmie Angel, a bush pilot searching for gold ore. Attempting to land on the heart-shaped mesa in 1937, Angel crashed his small Flamingo plane on top of Auyán-tepui and was forced to hike down the gradually sloping backside, a trip that took him and his crew 11 days to complete; he was immortalised when the waterfall was named after him.

Around 25 species of amphibians and reptiles are known from the summit plateau of Auyán-tepui, as well as numerous birds. Like many tepuis, the mountain hosts a rich assemblage of flora.

See also
Gran Sabana
 Distribution of Heliamphora

References

Further reading

  Brewer-Carías, C. (2010). El origen de los tepuyes: los hijos de las estrellas. Río Verde 3: 54–69.
 De Marmels, J. (1983). The Odonata of the region of Mount Auyantepui and the Sierra de Lema, in Venezuelan Guyana. 3. Additions to the families Gomphidae, Aeshnidae and Corduliidae, with description of Progomphus racenisi spec. nov.. Odonatologica 12(1): 1–13.
 De Marmels, J. (1994). Sympetrum chaconi spec. nov. from Auyan-Tepui, Venezuela, with notes on a pantepuyan form of Tramea binotata (Rambur) (Anisoptera: Libellulidae). Odonatologica 23(4): 405–412.
  Delascio Chitty, F. (1997). Apuntes sobre la vegetación del Auyantepui. Acta Terramaris 10: 27–42.
 Dennison, L.R. (1942). Devil Mountain. Hastings House, New York. 
 Dunsterville, G.C.K. (August 1964). Auyantepui, home of fifty million orchids. American Orchid Society Bulletin 1964: 678–689.
 Dunsterville, G.C.K. (1965). Auyantepui. Boletín de la Sociedad Venezolana de Ciencias Naturales 26(109): 163–171.
 Dunsterville, G.C.K. & E. Dunsterville (1982). Auyán-tepui: reminiscences of an orchid search. In: J. Arditti (ed.) Orchid Biology: Reviews and Perspectives, II. Cornell University Press, Ithaca, New York. pp. 19–38.
 Jaffe, K., J. Lattke & R. Perez-Hernández (January–June 1993). Ants on the tepuies of the Guiana Shield: a zoogeographic study. Ecotropicos 6(1): 21–28.
  Huber, O. (1976). Observaciones climatológicas sobre la región del Auyán-tepui (Edo. Bolívar). Boletín de la Sociedad Venezolana de Ciencias Naturales 32(132–133): 509–525.
  La Cruz, L. (February–April 2010). Iván Calderon y su mundo vertical. Río Verde 1: 98–115.
  Maguire, B. (1957). Resultados botánicos de la expedición de la Universidad Central de Venezuela a la región Auyantepui en la Guayana venezolana, abril de 1956. 1. Una nueva especie de la familia Cyperaceae. Acta Botánica Venezuelica 2(6): 43–45.
 Mecchia, M. & L. Piccini (1999). Hydrogeology and SiO2 geochemistry of the Aonda Cave system (Auyantepui, Bolivar, Venezuela). Boletín Sociedad Venezolana de Espeleología 33: 1–11.
 Moldenke, H.N. (1957). Resultados botánicos de la expedición de la Universidad Central de Venezuela a la región Auyantepui en la Guayana venezolana, abril de 1956. 2. Three new species of the family Eriocaulaceae. Acta Botánica Venezuelica 2(7): 47–50.
 Myers, C.W. (1997). Preliminary remarks on the summit herpetofauna of Auyantepui, eastern Venezuela. Acta Terramaris 10: 1–8.
  Phelps, W.H. (1938). La expedición del American Museum of Natural History al Monte Auyantepui. Boletín de la Sociedad Venezolana de Ciencias Naturales 4(32): 251–265.
  Rácenis, J. (May–August 1968). Los odonatos de la región del Auyantepui y de la Sierra de Lema, en la Guayana Venezolana. 1. Superfamilia Agrionoidea. Memoria de la Sociedad de Ciencias Naturales La Salle 28(80): 151–176.
  Rácenis, J. (1970). Los odonatos de la región del Auyantepui y de la Sierra de Lema, en la Guayana Venezolana. 2. Las familias Gomphidae, Aeshnidae y Corduliidae. Acta Biologica Venezuelica 7(1): 23–39.
  Roze, J.A. (1958). Los reptiles del Auyantepui, Venezuela, basándose en las colecciones de las expediciones de Phelps-Tate, del American Museum of Natural History, 1937–1938, y de la Universidad Central de Venezuela, 1956. Acta Biologica Venezuelica 2(22): 243–270.
  Señaris, J.C. (1995) ['1993']. Una nueva especie de Oreophrynella (Anura; Bufonidae) de la cima del Auyán-tepui, Estado Bolívar, Venezuela. Memoria de la Sociedad de Ciencias Naturales La Salle 53(140): 177–183.
  Señaris, J.C. & J. Ayarzagüena (1994) ['1993']. Una nueva especie de Centrolenella (Anura: Centrolenidae) del Auyán-tepui, Edo. Bolívar, Venezuela. Memoria de la Sociedad de Ciencias Naturales La Salle 53(139): 121–126.
  Steyermark, J.A. (1967). Flora del Auyán-tepui. Acta Botánica Venezuelica 2(5–8): 5–370.
  Tate, G.H.H. (1938). Auyantepui: notas sobre la Expedición Phelps (Phelps Venezuelan Expedition). Boletín de la Sociedad Venezolana de Ciencias Naturales 5(36): 96–125.
 Tate, G.H.H. (July 1938). Auyantepui: notes on the Phelps Venezuelan Expedition. Geographical Review 28(3): 452–474. 
 Vareschi, V. (1958). Resultados botánicos de la expedición de la Universidad Central de Venezuela a la región Auyantepui en la Guayana venezolana, abril de 1956. 3. Hymenophyllopsis universitatis, a new species endemic to Guayana and its relatives. Acta Biologica Venezuelica 2(15): 151–162.

Tepuis of Venezuela
Mountains of Venezuela
Mountains of Bolívar (state)
Canaima National Park